Dutch-Greek relations are foreign relations between the Netherlands and Greece. Since 1834, both countries have diplomatic relations.  The Netherlands have an embassy in Athens and 12 honorary consulates in Corfu, Herakleion, Kalamata, Kavala, Patras, Piraeus, Rhodes, Samos, Syros, Thessaloniki, Volos, and Ioannina. Greece has an embassy in The Hague, and a consulate-general in Rotterdam.
Both countries are full members of NATO and of the European Union.

In 1967, the Netherlands and three other countries brought the Greek Case against the Greek junta regime for human rights violations.

Culture 
The Netherlands Institute in Athens opened in 1984, and is one of 17 foreign archaeological institutes in Athens.

Diplomacy

Republic of Greece
The Hague (Embassy) 
Rotterdam (Consulate-General)

of the Netherlands
Athens (Embassy)

See also 
 Foreign relations of Greece
 Foreign relations of the Netherlands
 Greeks in the Netherlands

References

External links 
  Dutch Ministry of Foreign Affairs about relations with Greece (in Dutch only)
  Dutch embassy in Athens
 Greek Ministry of Foreign Affairs about relations with the Netherlands
 Greek embassy in the Netherlands

 
Netherlands
Greece